Rififi in Amsterdam is a black-and-white 1962 Dutch gangster film directed by Giovanni Korporaal.

Cast

 Maxim Hamel as Bert Oliemans 
 Johan Kaart as Commissaris Van Houthem 
 Jan Blaaser as Lauwe Freek 
 Rijk de Gooyer as De Bijenkorf 
 Steye van Brandenberg as Blauwbaard 
 Ton van Duinhoven as Manke Karel 
 Fien Berghegge as Tonia Oliemans
 Els Hillenius as Blonde Nellie 
 Willy Alberti as Kroegbaas 
 Anton Geesink as Rechercheur 
 Ton Vos as De Yank 
 Wim Poncia as De Mug 
 Frans Kokshoorn as Inspecteur Dijkema

External links 

 
 

1962 films
Dutch black-and-white films
Films set in the Netherlands
1962 crime films
Gangster films
Dutch crime films
1960s Dutch-language films